Hunter Tootega Nahi Todega is an upcoming Indian streaming television series schedule to premiere on 22 March 2023 on Amazon miniTV. Produced under Saregama and Yoodlee Films, the series stars Suniel Shetty, Esha Deol, Barkha Bisht and Rahul Dev.

Cast
 Suniel Shetty as Assistant Commissioner of Police Officer Vikram Chauhan  
 Esha Deol as Divya
 Barkha Bisht
 Rahul Dev as Hooda Kartoos  
 Karanvir Sharma as IPS. Sajid Shaikh
 Pawan Chopra
 Smita Jayakar
 Mihir Ahuja
 Siddharth Kher
 Harssh A Singh
 Enakshi Ganguly
 Teena Singh

Production
The series was announced by Saregama on Amazon miniTV consisting of eight episodes. Suniel Shetty, Esha Deol, Barkha Bisht and Rahul Dev were cast to appear in the series.
 
The trailer of the series was released in March 2023.

Music

References

External links
 
 

 
2023 Indian television series debuts
2020s Indian television series